Mark Tullo (born 9 February 1978) is a Chilean professional golfer.

Tullo was born in Santiago. He attended North Carolina State University in the United States on a golf scholarship, graduating with a degree in Business Management, and turned professional in 2003. He has entered the European Tour's qualifying school five times, only making it through to the final stage once, in 2009. He has competed on the second tier Challenge Tour since 2007, and won for the first time in August 2010 at the Rolex Trophy, where he edged out Matteo Manassero by a single stroke. He ended the 2010 season inside the top ten on the final Challenge Tour Rankings to graduate to the elite European Tour for 2011.

Tullo has also won many tournaments in Chile, including the Chile Open on two occasions, and topped the order of merit three times, in 2005, 2006 and 2007.

Amateur wins
1996–2002 18 wins in Chile

Professional wins (5)

Challenge Tour wins (3)

Other wins (2)
2005 Chile Open
2006 Chile Open

Team appearances
Amateur
Eisenhower Trophy (representing Chile): 2002

Professional
World Cup (representing Chile): 2008, 2013

See also
2010 Challenge Tour graduates
2012 Challenge Tour graduates
2014 Challenge Tour graduates

References

External links

Chilean male golfers
NC State Wolfpack men's golfers
European Tour golfers
Golfers at the 2015 Pan American Games
Pan American Games competitors for Chile
Sportspeople from Santiago
1978 births
Living people
21st-century Chilean people